Hedensted is a Danish town in Region Midtjylland and the seat of Hedensted Municipality. Its population, including its northern neighbouring town Løsning, is 12,220. The municipality as a whole has a population of 47,099 (1 January 2022).

History
The oldest and one of the most important buildings in the town is the local church (Hedensted Kirke), built around 1175. It is especially noted for its early murals showing Christ, St. Peter, and St. Paul.

Hedensted had the benefits of a railway station from 1868 until it was closed down in 1974. However, in 2006 the station was reopened on roughly the same spot.

Like many other Danish towns, Hedensted was expanded with large residential areas around the original town centre. Later, industrial parks followed south and west of the town.

Geography
Hedensted is located midway between the larger towns of Horsens and Vejle. East of Hedensted, by the coast, lies the town of Juelsminde which in 2007 became a part of the municipality of Hedensted.

Notable people 
 Jens Jensen-Egeberg (1848 in Hedensted – 1922) a Danish painter of portraits, landscapes and genre scenes. He also worked in pastels. 
 Johannes Carl Andersen (1873 in Klakring – 1962) a New Zealand clerk, poet, ethnologist, librarian, editor and historian
 Jens Jacob Bregnø (1877 in Hedensted – 1946) a Danish sculptor and ceramics designer
 Margrethe Hald (1897 in Neder Vrigsted – 1982) a Danish textile historian and a curator at the National Museum of Denmark
 Paul Hüttel (born 1935 in Hedensted) a Danish actor, appearing in over 50 films and TV shows since 1960

Sport 
 Henrik Lundgaard (born 1969 in Hedensted) a Danish rally driver
 Sarah Paulsen (born 1987 in Hedensted) a Danish handball player who plays for Viborg HK
 Christian Lundgaard (born 2001 in Hedensted) a Danish racing driver

References

External links

Hedensted Municipality
Cities and towns in the Central Denmark Region